Abdy is a surname. Notable people with the surname include:

 Anthony Abdy (disambiguation), multiple people
 Edward Strutt Abdy (1791–1846), English legal academic
 John Abdy (disambiguation), multiple people
 Maria Abdy (1797–1867), English poet
 Sir Robert Abdy, 3rd Baronet (1688–1748), British politician
 See also Robert Abdy (disambiguation)
 Rowena Meeks Abdy (1887–1945), American modernist painter
 Sir Thomas Abdy, 1st Baronet, of Felix Hall (1612–1686), English lawyer and landowner
 Sir Thomas Abdy, 1st Baronet, of Albyns (1810–1877), British Member of Parliament
 Sir William Abdy, 7th Baronet (1779–1868), British politician

References